Hartford Public High School, in Hartford, Connecticut, was founded in 1638. It is the second-oldest public secondary school in the United States, after the Boston Latin School. It is part of the Hartford Public Schools district.

Notable alumni

 Michael Adams, class of 1981, NBA All-Star and coach
 Morgan Bulkeley, Governor of Connecticut, U.S. Senator
 Marcus Camby, class of 1993, NBA player 1996–2013
 Franklin Chang-Diaz, class of 1969, NASA astronaut
Katharine Seymour Day, historical preservationist
 Monk Dubiel, class of 1936, former MLB player
Reuben Ewing (born Reuben Cohen), Major League Baseball player
 Edward M. Gallaudet, class of 1851, president of Gallaudet University in Washington, D.C., from 1864–1910
 George Kirgo, class of 1943, screenwriter, author, humorist, and founding member of the National Film Preservation Board of the Library of Congress
 Nick Koback, class of 1953, former MLB player 
 Pete Naktenis, class of 1932, former MLB player
 Elyse Knox, class of 1935, actress, married Tom Harmon 
 Bob Nash, class of 1968, basketball player
 Frederick E. Olmsted, class of 1891, forester, one of the founders of American forestry and the National Forest
 Eddie A. Perez, class of 1976, Mayor of Hartford, 2001–2010
 Lindy Remigino, class of 1949, Olympic track athlete
John Trumbull Robinson, US Attorney for the district of Connecticut
 Harold Rome, class of 1923, songwriter
 George Dudley Seymour, class of 1878, historian, attorney, planner
Allan K. Smith , US Attorney for the district of Connecticut
 Marlon Starling, class of 1976, WBC & WBA Welterweight World Champion
 Griffin Alexander Stedman, Union Army Colonel in the Civil War
 Tony Todd, class of 1972, actor
 Kang Tongbi, Chinese feminist
 Les Payne, class of 1958, Pulitzer Prize winner, journalist
 Annie Eliot Trumbull, class of 1876, writer
 Laura Wheeler Waring, class of 1906, college teacher and artist of the Harlem Renaissance
 Mary Rogers Williams, class of 1875, artist
 Hilda Crosby Standish, medical doctor and birth control pioneer

See also

 List of the oldest public high schools in the United States

References

External links
 

Schools in Hartford, Connecticut
Public high schools in Connecticut
Educational institutions established in the 1630s
1638 establishments in the British Empire